Political globalization is the growth of the worldwide political system, both in size and complexity. That system includes national governments, their governmental and intergovernmental organizations as well as government-independent elements of global civil society such as international non-governmental organizations and social movement organizations. One of the key aspects of the political globalization is the declining importance of the nation-state and the rise of other actors on the political scene. The creation and existence of the United Nations is called one of the classic examples of political globalization.

Political globalization is one of the three main dimensions of globalization commonly found in academic literature, with the two other being economic globalization and cultural globalization.

Definitions
William R. Thompson has defined it as "the expansion of a global political system, and its institutions, in which inter-regional transactions (including, but certainly not limited to trade) are managed".  Valentine M. Moghadam defined it as "an increasing trend toward multilateralism (in which the United Nations plays a key role), to an emerging 'transnational state apparatus,' and toward the emergence of national and international nongovernmental organizations that act as watchdogs over governments and have increased their activities and influence". Manfred B. Steger in turn wrote that it "refers to the intensification and expansion of political interrelations across the globe". The longer definition by Colin Crouch goes as follows: "Political globalization refers to the growing power of institutions of global governance such as the World Bank, the International Monetary Fund (IMF) and the World Trade Organization (WTO). But it also refers to the spread and influence of international non-governmental organizations, social movement organizations and transnational advocacy networks operating across borders and constituting a kind of global civil society." Finally, Gerard Delanty and Chris Rumford define it as "a tension between three processes which interact to produce the complex field of global politics: global geopolitics, global normative culture and polycentric networks." The book World Federalist Manifesto, Guide to Political Globalization defines political globalization as "the creation of a system of global governance that regulates relationships among nations and guarantees the rights arising from social and economic globalization."

Methodology
Salvatore Babones discussing sources used by scholars for studying political globalizations noted the usefulness of Europa World Year Book for data on diplomatic relationships between countries, publications of International Institute for Strategic Studies such as The Military Balance for matters of military, and US government publication Patterns of Global Terrorism for matters of terrorism.

Political globalization is measured by aggregating and weighting data on the number of embassies and high commissioners in a country, the number of the country's membership in international organization, its participation in the UN peacekeeping missions, and the number of international treaties signed by said country. This measure has been used by Axel Dreher, Noel Gaston, Pim Martens Jeffrey Haynes and is available from the KOF institute at ETH Zurich.

Aspects
Like globalization itself, political globalization has several dimensions and lends itself to a number of interpretations. It has been discussed in the context of new emancipatory possibilities, as well as in the context of loss of autonomy and fragmentation of the social world. Political globalization can be seen in changes such as democratization of the world, creation of the global civil society, and moving beyond the centrality of the nation-state, particularly as the sole actor in the field of politics. Some of the questions central to the discussion of the political globalization are related to the future of the nation-state, whether its importance is diminishing and what are the causes for those changes; and understanding the emergence of the concept of global governance. The creation and existence of the United Nations has been called one of the classic examples of political globalization. Political actions by non-governmental organizations and social movements, concerned about various topics such as environmental protection, is another example.

David Held has proposed that continuing political globalization may lead to the creation of a world government-like cosmopolitan democracy, though this vision has also been criticized as too idealistic.

Political Globalization and Nation State
There is a heated debate over Political Globalization and Nation State. The question arises whether or not political globalization signifies the decline of the nation-state. Hyper globalists argue that globalization has engulfed today's world in such a way that state boundaries are beginning to lose significance. However, skeptics disregard this as naiveté, believing that the nation-state remains the supreme actor in international relations.

See also
 Global citizenships
 Global civics
 Global politics
 Supranational union
 Transnational citizenship
 Transnationalism

References

Further reading
 Ougaard, M. 2004. Political Globalization: State, Power, and Social Forces. New York: Palgrave Macmillan.

External links
KOF Index of Globalization

Globalization
Politics
Global politics